Jan Hendrik Stander (born 21 April 1993) is a South African rugby union professional player who last played for the  in the Currie Cup and in the Rugby Challenge. His regular position is lock.

Career

Limpopo

Hailing from Phalaborwa, Stander was selected to represent  at provincial level; he played for them at the 2006 Under-13 Craven Week, at the 2009 Under-16 Grant Khomo Week and (despite still being Under-17) at the premier high school rugby union competition in South Africa, the 2010 Under-18 Craven Week held in Welkom.

Golden Lions

However, he didn't complete his schooling in Limpopo. In 2011, he moved to Krugersdorp, where he attended Hoërskool Monument for his matric year.

After his involvement with the South Africa Under-20 squad on their tour of Argentina and in the 2013 IRB Junior World Championship, he returned to South Africa to make nine appearances for the s in the 2013 Under-21 Provincial Championship. He missed out on the semi-final, where the Golden Lions lost 41–44 to  after extra time.

He started twelve of the s' matches during the 2014 Under-21 Provincial Championship, with tries against  and  helping his side reach the semi-finals once again.

Pumas

The Pumas won the Vodacom Cup for the first time in 2015, beating  24–7 in the final. Stander made four appearances during the season.

South Africa Under-20

In 2013, Stander was included in a South Africa Under-20 squad that toured Argentina as preparation for the 2013 IRB Junior World Championship. He was initially not selected in the final squad that participated at the tournament in France, but was later included following an injury to Jannes Kirsten. He was named on the bench for their third-place play-off match against New Zealand, but failed to take to the field in a 41–34 victory.

References

Alumni of Monument High School
South African rugby union players
Living people
1993 births
People from Phalaborwa
Rugby union locks
Golden Lions players
Pumas (Currie Cup) players
South Africa Under-20 international rugby union players
Rugby union players from Limpopo